At Swim 2 Birds is a collaborative album by Peter Jefferies and Jono Lonie, released in 1987 through Flying Nun Records. Its title may reference the novel of the same name.

Track listing

Personnel
Peter Jefferies – drums, tape, percussion, piano, guitar on "Introduction"
Jono Lonie – guitar, tape, percussion, violin
Sally Lonie – illustrations

References

1987 albums
Flying Nun Records albums
Peter Jefferies albums